The March 717 was a British Group 7 sports prototype racing car, built by March Engineering in 1970 for the Can-Am series. As with all other full-size Can-Am cars of the time, it used a large-displacement, mid-mounted, naturally-aspirated, Chevrolet big-block V8 engine, making . Like its predecessor, it was driven by legendary New Zealand racing driver, Chris Amon.

References

Sports prototypes
Can-Am cars
March vehicles